National Libraries Day is an annual event in the UK dedicated to the celebration of libraries and librarians. The inaugural event was held on 4 February 2012.

To celebrate National Libraries Day, events including author talks and competitions are organised across the country by local authorities, universities, other providers of library services and local community groups.

Channel 4's Culture Editor, Matthew Cain, described the 2012 National Libraries Day as "most important" due to the "serious concern about the future for libraries".

Children's Laureate Julia Donaldson released a poem to mark the day, adding that if we "lose libraries, we would lose readers and we would become a less literate country".

The 2013 event was scheduled to take place on 9 February 2013.

Background

Following Save our Libraries Day in 2011, author and library campaigner Alan Gibbons proposed that the first day in February be made National Libraries Day after receiving emails suggesting that there should be a chance to "celebrate our libraries".

On 25 May 2011, Gibbons announced that:

The Library Book

In support of the first National Libraries Day, a book was published featuring a number of authors contributing their thoughts on why they think libraries matter. The book features contributions from Alan Bennett, Julian Barnes and Stephen Fry, with all the proceeds going to The Reading Agency to aid their work supporting libraries.

Supporters

National Libraries Day is supported by a range of organisations including:

 The Bookseller
 Booktrust
 Campaign for the Book
 Chartered Institute of Library and Information Professionals
 The Library Campaign
 National Literacy Trust
 The Publishers Association
 The Reading Agency
 The Society of Authors
 Unison
 Voices for the Library
 Women's Institutes

References

Libraries in the United Kingdom
Public awareness campaigns